Jwaalamukhi is a 1985 Indian Kannada-language film directed by Singeetham Srinivasa Rao. The film featured Rajkumar, Gayathri, Thoogudeepa Srinivas, K. S. Ashwath and Mukhyamantri Chandru. The movie is based on a novel of same name by Vijay Sasanur.

Initially, it was planned to adapt the novel Shivatandava by the same writer into a movie. Eventually, the plan was dropped and Jwaalamukhi was selected.

Plot
The story revolves around the heroics of Jayasimha, played by Rajkumar. The story starts with an introductory scene where Jayasimha explains his resignation as a professor. Well educated, rich in values and honesty will be Jayasimha's attributes. He exposes the forgery done by mischief in the college and the favorable probe trial of that case makes him resign from the college. The mischief maker happens to be the son of the influential builder in the town, Gunasekara, played by Mukhyamantri Chandru.

Soon after leaving the professor job, he starts working for a press led by Rudraiah, played by K. S. Ashwath. He becomes successful in changing the mindset of matka mafia gang leader Ratanlal, played by Thoogudeepa Srinivas. In the meanwhile, Jayasimha falls in love with Gayathri, who plays the role of Tejaswini. The second half of the story unfolds the battle between truth/fact-finding versus influence and power of Gunasekara.

The movie marks the splendid performance of Rajkumar in the role of a fighter against injustice.

Cast
 Rajkumar as Jayasimha
 Gayathri as Tejaswini (Voice dubbed by B. Jayashree)
 Thoogudeepa Srinivas as Ratanlal
 K. S. Ashwath as Rudraiah
 Leelavathi
 Advani Lakshmi Devi
 Shivaram
 Mukhyamantri Chandru as Gunasekhar

Soundtrack
The song Baale Prema Geethe was loosely inspired by the song Tere Mere Sapne from the 1965 Hindi movie Guide.

References

External links
 

1985 films
1980s Kannada-language films
Films directed by Singeetam Srinivasa Rao
Films scored by M. Ranga Rao
Indian action drama films
Films based on Indian novels
1980s action drama films